James Allan (born 17 January 1985) is an Australian rules football player who played for the North Adelaide Roosters and the Norwood Redlegs in the South Australian National Football League (SANFL). Allan is a three-time winner of the league's highest individual honor, the Magarey Medal (2007, 2010 and 2011).

Career
Allan was recruited to the Roosters from his home in Lara, Victoria, for the 2007 season and became an instant star for the club. After making his league debut against Central District in round 1 of the 2007 season Allan went on to win the first of his three Magarey Medals. He dominated the media awards for the season winning The Advertiser and Football Budget Player of the Year and won selection in The Advertisers Team of the Year. He also won North Adelaide's best and fairest award for the first of five consecutive times.

North's form for 2007 rose with the arrival of Allan and they played in their first Grand Final since their 1991 premiership. Central District were too good for the Roosters, North going down by 65 points, 5.12 (42) to 16.11 (107).

Allan continued to take the SANFL by storm, further dominating league, media and club awards. He added the 2010 and 2011 Magarey Medals to his 2007 win and would be selected to every Advertiser Team of the Year since his debut as well as five consecutive Football Budget Player of the Year awards from 2007–2011.

As of the end of the 2011 season, Allan is second only to Barrie Robran in both Magarey Medal wins and North Adelaide best and fairest awards. Allan has won five best and fairest awards for the Roosters (2007–11) while Robran won eight during his stellar career (1967–73 and 1976).

On 5 September 2012, it was announced that Allan would end his career with North Adelaide at the end of the season and return to his native Victoria in 2013.

In mid-November 2013, the North Adelaide Football Club announced that Allan was returning to take up a teaching position in Adelaide and would rejoin the club as a player for the 2014 season.
Unfortunately for North Adelaide fans, Allan did not play for the club in 2014. Due to salary cap issues he could not come to terms with the club and announced he would play for rival club Norwood. He was included in Norwood's 2014 Grand Final team after missing the previous six weeks with a broken arm. He finished with 23 disposals, five clearances and five tackles and most importantly, a premiership medallion.

Representative career
Allan has represented South Australia twice in interstate football.

References

External links
 
 

1985 births
North Adelaide Football Club players
Living people
Magarey Medal winners
Australian rules footballers from Victoria (Australia)
Lara Football Club players
Waratah Football Club players
Norwood Football Club players
Werribee Football Club players